Marianne Haukland  (born 1 January 1989) is a Norwegian politician.

She was elected deputy representative to the Storting from Finnmark for the period 2017–2021 for the Conservative Party. She replaced Frank Bakke-Jensen at the Storting from October 2017, while Bakke-Jensen serves as Minister of EEC- and EU affairs. In the Storting, Haukland is a member of the Standing Committee on Family and Cultural Affairs.

Haukland hails from Alta, and has studied political science at the University of Tromsø.

References

1989 births
Living people
People from Alta, Norway
University of Tromsø alumni
Conservative Party (Norway) politicians
Members of the Storting
21st-century Norwegian politicians